Norman Philip Hastings Jones  (15 August 1923 – 19 November 1987) was a New Zealand National Party politician, who represented the Invercargill electorate in Parliament.

Biography

Jones was born on 15 August 1923 in Invercargill. He was one of six brothers and two sisters and the only one of the brothers to complete primary school, although he left secondary school shortly before his 15th birthday. From that point on he held a number of short-term jobs, working principally as a farm labourer before he joined the New Zealand Army in 1941 after lying about his age. He served as a private in the 23rd Infantry Battalion during World War II and lost his right leg to tank-fire at the age of 19 in North Africa. After his war service he attended Otago and Victoria Universities and Dunedin Teachers' College. He taught at Wanganui for some time before returning south to become assistant master at Southland College. Subsequently, he worked at James Hargest High School and at Southland Boys' High School.

Jones and his wife Marjorie were committee members of the Save Manapouri campaign.

Jones was an Invercargill city councillor for 18 years, and served one term as deputy mayor. In the 1975 Queen's Birthday Honours, he was awarded the Queen's Service Medal for public services, for services to civil defence and the community. He became particularly notable for his vehement opposition to the Homosexual Law Reform Act 1986. Owing to his outspokenness on this and other issues, the media dubbed him "the mouth from the south".  When the Labour Party won office in 1984, an economic summit took place in the parliamentary debating chamber. Representatives from industry, unions and community groups attended. Jones refused to vacate his seat, saying he would not give up his chair for some communist to sit down.

Jones first stood for Parliament at a by-election in 1945. He remained in Parliament until shortly before his death in 1987.

Jones died on 19 November 1987 from a brain tumour at the age of 64. His autobiography, Jonesy, published five years earlier in 1982, detailed his wartime service and his political career. A number of the most controversial aspects and events of his public service occurred after the book's publication.

Notes

References

External links
New Zealand History online: "Norman Jones speaking against homosexual law reform" (photograph included)
New Zealand History online: "Homosexual law reform in New Zealand"

1923 births
1987 deaths
Invercargill City Councillors
New Zealand educators
New Zealand National Party MPs
New Zealand military personnel of World War II
People from Invercargill
Burials at Eastern Cemetery, Invercargill
Deaths from brain tumor
Deaths from cancer in New Zealand
Neurological disease deaths in New Zealand
Deputy mayors of Invercargill
Place of birth missing
Place of death missing
New Zealand MPs for South Island electorates
Members of the New Zealand House of Representatives
Unsuccessful candidates in the 1946 New Zealand general election
Recipients of the Queen's Service Medal
New Zealand politicians with disabilities